Rational mechanics may refer to:
 mécanique rationelle, a historical (19th century) term for classical mechanics
a school of thought within physics advocated by Clifford Truesdell in the 1960s

See also
Newtonianism
Auguste Comte
Archive for Rational Mechanics and Analysis
rational thermodynamics